Waverly may refer to:

Education
United States
 Waverly Community Schools, a school district located in Lansing, Michigan
 Waverly School District 145, Nebraska
 Waverly Central School District, New York
 Waverly High School (disambiguation)
 The Waverly School, a private school in Pasadena, California

Hotels
 Hotel Waverly, Toronto, Ontario, Canada
 Hotel Waverly (New Bedford, Massachusetts), United States, on the National Register of Historic Places
 The Waverly, Hendersonville, North Carolina, United States, a historic hotel on the National Register of Historic Places

Places
United States
 Waverly, Alabama, a town
 Waverly, Colorado, an unincorporated community
 Waverly, Florida, a census-designated place
 Waverly, Georgia, an unincorporated community
 Waverly, Illinois, a small city
 Waverly Lake, Illinois, a reservoir
 Waverly, Indiana, an unincorporated community
 Waverly, Iowa, a city
 Waverly, Kansas, a city
 Waverly, Kentucky, a city
 Waverly, Louisiana, an unincorporated community
 Waverly, Baltimore, Maryland, a neighborhood
 Waverly, Michigan, an unincorporated community and census-designated place
 Waverly Township, Cheboygan County, Michigan
 Waverly Township, Van Buren County, Michigan
 Waverly, Minnesota, a city
 Waverly Township, Minnesota
 Waverly, Mississippi, an unincorporated community
 Waverly, Missouri, a city
 Waverly Township, Lincoln County, Missouri, an inactive township
 Waverly, Nebraska, a city
 Waverly, Franklin County, New York, a town
 Waverly, Tioga County, New York, a village
 Waverly, Ohio, a village
 Waverly Township, Lackawanna County, Pennsylvania
 Waverly, Pennsylvania, an unincorporated community within the above township
 Waverly, South Dakota, an unincorporated community and census-designated place
 Waverly, Tennessee, a city
 Waverly (Old Wavery) and New Waverly, populated areas next to Sam Houston National Forest, in Texas
 Waverly, Virginia, a town
 Waverly, Albemarle County, Virginia, an unincorporated community in Albemarle County, Virginia
 Waverly, Caroline County, Virginia, an unincorporated community
 Waverly, Washington, a town
 Waverly, West Virginia, a census-designated place
 Waverly, Wisconsin, an unincorporated community

Antarctica
 Waverly Glacier, Palmer Land

Other uses
 Waverly (given name)
 Waverly Plantation (Leon County, Florida), United States
 Waverly Plantation (Cunningham, North Carolina), United States, on the National Register of Historic Places
 Waverly (house) (disambiguation), various historic American houses and mansions, United States
 Waverly Theater, renamed the IFC Center, an art house movie theater in Greenwich Village, New York City, New York, United States
 Waverly Bridge (disambiguation)
 Waverly Fairgrounds, home of the Elizabeth Resolutes of the National Association, baseball's first major league, in 1873
 Waverly (brand), a home fashion brand
 Waverly Films, a Brooklyn-based group of filmmakers, United States
 Alexander Waverly, a fictional character in the 1960s TV series The Man from U.N.C.L.E. and The Girl from U.N.C.L.E.

See also
 Waverley (disambiguation)
 Waverly Hall, Georgia, US
 New Waverly, Texas, US
 South Waverly, Pennsylvania, US
 Waverly Place, a street in Manhattan, New York City, New York, US
 Waverly Historic District (disambiguation)
 Waverly Village Hall (disambiguation)